Hellula galapagensis is a moth in the family Crambidae. It was described by Bernard Landry and Lazaro Roque-Albelo in 2008. It is found on the Galápagos Islands.

References

Moths described in 2008
Glaphyriini